The Shanghai Job (S.M.A.R.T. Chase in North America) is a 2017 British-Chinese action thriller film by director Charles Martin, with a cast that includes Orlando Bloom, Leo Wu, Simon Yam, Hannah Quinlivan and Lynn Hung. 
The film was set for a 30 September 2017 release in China, with later dates for other countries.

Plot
Danny Stratton, a washed-up private security agent, is given the rare opportunity to escort a valuable Chinese antique out of Shanghai, but is ambushed en route. With the safety of the woman he loves in jeopardy, Danny has to work with his Security Management Action Recovery Team members to save her, as a dreadful conspiracy begins to unravel.

Cast
Orlando Bloom as Danny Stratton	
Hannah Quinlivan as J. Jae Anh
Simon Yam as Mach Ren
Leo Wu as DingDong Tang
Lynn Hung as Ling Mo, Daniel's girlfriend. 
Jing Liang, as Yen, a ruthless and cunning gang leader. 
Yanneng Shi
Rong Chang
Da Ying
Tom Price as Ciem

Production

Development
Formerly known as S.M.A.R.T. Chase: Fire & Earth, the shooting of the film ended in late 2016. Sino-American company Bliss Media financed the film and produced alongside London-based management and production company 42. Bliss Media has the Chinese distribution right, while Creative Artists Agency represents the film’s domestic rights. IMR International sold the remaining global rights at the 2016 film industry event American Film Market.

Reception

Box office
Released in Mainland China on 30 September 2017, the film did not meet expectations, only grossing $2,637,520 over the period. Universal Pictures made a limited release in America on 31 August 2018.

Home media 
It was released on DVD, Blu-ray, Amazon Prime, iTunes Store on 2 October 2018 in North America.

References

External links
 

Chinese action thriller films
British action thriller films
2010s English-language films
2010s Mandarin-language films
2010s British films